Abdullah Hamad Al-Marri (Arabic:عبد الله المري; born 3 June 1995) is a Qatari footballer who plays as a midfielder for Qatari club Al-Sailiya.

Honours

Club
Al-Sailiya SC
 Qatar FA Cup: 2021
 Qatari Stars Cup: 2020-21

External links
 

1995 births
Living people
Qatari footballers
Association football midfielders
Al-Sailiya SC players
Qatar Stars League players